Yuracjasa (possibly from Quechua yuraq white, q'asa mountain pass, "white mountain pass") is a mountain in the Vilcanota mountain range in the Andes of Peru, about  high. It is located in the Puno Region, Melgar Province, in the north of the Nuñoa District, near Chullupata.

References

Mountains of Peru
Mountains of Puno Region